Villanueva de los Infantes may refer to the following places in Spain:

Villanueva de los Infantes, Ciudad Real, municipality in the province of Ciudad Real, Castilla-La Mancha
Villanueva de los Infantes, Valladolid, municipality in the province of Valladolid, Castile and León

See also
Villanueva